Corbo is a Canadian drama film from Quebec, written and directed by Mathieu Denis.

Based on a true story, the film stars Anthony Therrien as Giovanni (Jean) Corbo, the privileged but socially alienated son of wealthy Italian-Canadian businessman Nicola Corbo (Tony Nardi) and his wife Mignonne (Marie Brassard), who becomes radicalized after a chance meeting with two young activists (Karelle Tremblay and Antoine L'Écuyer) draws him into the Front de libération du Québec.

Cast
 Anthony Therrien as Jean Corbo
 Antoine L'Écuyer as François
 Karelle Tremblay as Julie
 Tony Nardi as Nicola Corbo
 Marie Brassard as Mignonne Corbo
 Jean-François Pronovost as Frère de Jean
 Francis Ducharme as Mathieu
 Simon Pigeon as Jacques
 Maxime Mailloux as Alain
 Laurent-Christophe De Ruelle as Louis
 Jean-François Poulin as Robert
 Stéphane Demers as Professeur Lacasse
 Dino Tavarone as Achille Corbo
 Jean-Léon Rondeau as Directeur du collège
 Jean-Luc Terriault as Élève Gagnon
 Franco Montesano as Dino
 Sylvain Castonguay as André Lagrenade
 Thérèse Perreault as Thérèse Morin
 Jean-Simon Leduc as André
 Félix-Antoine Duval as René
 Jean Antoine Charest as Georges Ménard
 Richard Champagne as Policier
 Simon Chaussé as Lieutenant

Reception
The film premiered at the 2014 Toronto International Film Festival, before going into general release in 2015. It garnered three Canadian Screen Award nominations at the 4th Canadian Screen Awards in 2016, for Best Picture, Best Supporting Actor (Tony Nardi) and Best Costume Design (Judy Jonker), and 10 Jutra Award nominations at the 18th Jutra Awards.

It was shortlisted for the Prix collégial du cinéma québécois in 2016.

References

External links
 

2014 films
2014 drama films
Canadian drama films
Works about Italian-Canadian culture
French-language Canadian films
2010s Canadian films
Films directed by Mathieu Denis